This is a list of notable people from Delhi, India.

Architect
 Ratish Nanda,  conservation architect

Author
Anurag Anand
Asloob Ahmad Ansari
 Chetan Bhagat
 Bedil Dehlavi (1642–1720), poet 
 Ghalib, Urdu/Persian poet
Kiran Desai
Madhur Jaffrey
Meenakshi Jain
Ritu Lalit
Jaishree Misra
Amrita Pritam
Aman Nath
 Tushar Raheja
Nattal Sahu, writer during Tomara reign
Gaurav Sharma
Shobha Deepak Singh
Nitin Soni
Vibudh Shridhar, writer in medieval period
Sudhir Tailang, Cartoonist
Valmik Thapar
 Zauq, poet laureate of Mughal court
 Bahadurshah Zafar, Mughal king (last to rule from Mughal Dynasty) and Urdu poet

Business
Kunal Bahl, entrepreneur
Rohit Bansal, entrepreneur
Vijay Shekhar Sharma, entrepreneur, Paytm
Analjit Singh, entrepreneur, Max Group 
Vikram Lal, entrepreneur, Eicher Motors
Jawed Habib, hairstylist, entrepreneur
Patu Keswani, entrepreneur
Surinder Mehta
Bharat Ram
Kunwer Sachdev, entrepreneur
Ajay Singh, businessman, sports administrator, bureaucrat and investor

Education
 Jasleen Dhamija (born 1933), textile historian
Deepak Gaur, molecular biologist, and professor
Anil Grover
Partha Sarathi Gupta
Champat Rai Jain
Hakim Ajmal Khan
Syed Ahmad Khan
Madhu Khanna
Sunil Kothari
Sushil Kumar Saxena
Malati Shendge
Sampat Kumar Tandon

Journalist
Gopinath Aman
Afshan Anjum
Vikram Chandra
Barkha Dutt
Sagarika Ghose
Sonal Kalra
Mayanti Langer
Charul Malik
Rajat Sharma
Sabina Sehgal Saikia
Hari Shankar Vyas

Law and judiciary
Sanjiv Khanna
Subodh Markandeya

Medical
Daljeet Singh Gambhir
Hemlata Gupta
Jitendra Mohan Hans
Ganesh Kumar Mani
Siddhartha Mukherjee
Indira Nath
Abha Saxena
Krishna Gopal Saxena
Santosh Kumar Sen
Sujata Sharma
Noshir M. Shroff, Ophthalmologist
M. V. Padma Srivastava
Nikhil Tandon
Brihaspati Dev Triguna

Military
Anuj Nayyar, Indian army captain 
Pervez Musharraf, 7th Army Chief of Pakistan.

Performing arts

Actors
Varun Badola
Arjan Bajwa
Manoj Bakshi
Rohit Bakshi
Rakesh Bedi
Tahir Raj Bhasin
Gajendra Chauhan
Priyanshu Chatterjee
Aakash Dahiya
Mukul Dev
Rahul Dev
Ajay Devgan (born 1969), Indian Bollywood actor and producer
Rajneesh Duggal
Gulshan Grover
Karan Singh Grover, television and Bollywood actor
Zain Imam, television actor
Sourabh Raj Jain, television actor
Kishore Namit Kapoor
Ram Kapoor
Shahid Kapoor
Shakti Kapoor
Saif Ali Khan (born 1970), Indian actor 
Shah Rukh Khan (born 1965), Indian Bollywood actor
Rajesh Khattar, actor
Samir Kochhar
Himansh Kohli
Akshay Kumar
Darshan Kumar
Manoj Kumar
Laksh Lalwani
Pavan Malhotra
Siddharth Malhotra, actor
Shivin Narang
Hiten Noonwal
Manoj Pahwa
Ssumier Pasricha, actor and comedian
Pran
Vijay Raaz
Gautam Rode
Sumeet Sachdev
Anuj Sachdeva
Amit Sadh
Saqib Saleem
Pulkit Samrat
Keith Sequeira
Divyendu Sharma
Satyajit Sharma
Saurabh Shukla
Inderpal Singh
Manjot Singh
Shaurya Singh
Barun Sobti, television actor
Karan Wahi
Mohammed Zeeshan Ayyub

Actress
Roma Arora
Neelima Azeem
Naseem Banu
Ritu Barmecha
Bipasha Basu
Swara Bhaskar
Bibbo
Sheeba Chaddha
Isha Chawla
Ridhi Dogra
Esha Gupta
Neena Gupta
Padmapriya Janakiraman
Vaani Kapoor
Minissha Lamba
Radhika Madan
Madhubala (1933–69), Indian Bollywood actress
Rashi Mal
Sanya Malhotra
Manasvi Mamgai
Monal Naval
Arundathi Nag
Shonali Nagrani
Aishveryaa Nidhi
Tapsee Pannu
Huma Qureshi, actress
Kriti Sanon, actress
Amba Sanyal (born 1945), stage actor and costume designer
Deeksha Seth
Pooja Sharma
Urvashi Sharma
Deepika Singh
Kashish Singh
Neetu Singh
Rakul Preet Singh
Raashi Khanna
Sarika Thakur
Vani Tripathi

Directors, producers and writers
Atul Agnihotri
Shubhavi Arya
Vikas Bahl (born 1971), Indian film producer, screenwriter, and director
Dev Benegal
Aditya Dhar
 Amar Kanwar (born 1964), Indian film director and contemporary artist
Rajat Kapoor
Bhushan Kumar
Divya Khosla Kumar
Gulshan Kumar
Anu Malhotra
Rakeysh Omprakash Mehra
Nisha Pahuja
Aanand L. Rai
Maneesh Sharma
Alankrita Shrivastava
Loveleen Tandan

Singers
KK (singer)
 Sunidhi Chauhan
 Javed Ali
 Akriti Kakar
 Prakriti Kakar
 Sukriti Kakar
 Harshdeep Kaur
 Tulsi Kumar
 Madhup Mudgal
 Anushka Manchanda
 Mukesh Chand Mathur, Bollywood singer
 Bif Naked (born 1971), Canadian punk rock singer
 Peter Plate (born 1967), German singer, songwriter and producer (Rosenstolz)
 Honey Singh

Choreography
Shakti Mohan

Philanthropists and social workers
Kiran Martin

Politics
 Paddy Ashdown (1941–2018), British politician
 Ramesh Bidhuri
 Ramvir Singh Bidhuri
 Michael Bennet (born 1964), American politician
 Sheila Dikshit, former Chief minister
 Gautam Gambhir
 Maneka Gandhi
 Priyanka Gandhi
 Rahul Gandhi
 S. Jaishankar
 Arun Jaitley
 Arvind Kejriwal, Chief minister
 Meenakshi Lekhi, Cabinet minister 
 Chaudhary Bharat Singh 
 Ajay Maken
 Pervez Musharraf (born 1943), Pakistani politician
 Kedar Nath Sahani
 Kanwar Singh Tanwar
 Harsh Vardhan
 Sahib Singh Verma
 Parvesh Sahib Singh Verma

Rulers

Rajputs
Anangpal Tomar, King of Haryana and Delhi
Prithviraj Chauhan, King of much of North India

Sayyids
Muhammad Shah

Lodi
Ibrahim Lodhi

Mughals
Ahmad Shah Bahadur
Shah Alam II
Bahadur Shah Zafar

Science  
Diwakar Vaish, roboticist

Sports

Athletic
Arun Bhardwaj
Amoj Jacob
Lalit Mathur
Tejaswin Shankar
Sourabh Vij

Badminton
Damayanti Tambay

Billiards
 Geet Sethi (born 1961), Indian billiard player and world champion

Chess
Aryan Chopra
Sahaj Grover
 Parimarjan Negi (born 1993), Indian chess player
Tania Sachdev

Cricket
 Mohinder Amarnath
 Kirti Azad
 Amit Bhandari
 Unmukt Chand
 Chetan Chauhan
 Aakash Chopra
 Anjum Chopra
 Nikhil Chopra
 Vijay Dahiya 
 Shikhar Dhawan
 Salim Durani
 Gautam Gambhir
 Rajinder Goel
 Shilpa Gupta
 Ajay Jadeja
 Surinder Khanna
 Virat Kohli
 Raman Lamba
 Warren Lee
 Reema Malhotra
 Mithun Manhas
 Amit Mishra
 Parvinder Awana
 Ashish Nehra
 Mansoor Ali Khan Pataudi
 Manoj Prabhakar
 Vivek Razdan
 Rahul Sanghvi
 Virender Sehwag
 Ajay Sharma
 Amita Sharma
 Ishant Sharma
 Sanjeev Sharma
 Robin Singh, Jr.
 Sunil Valson
 Atul Wassan

Football
Jyoti Ann Burrett
Aayushmaan Chaturvedi
Aditi Chauhan
Dalima Chhibber
Narender Gahlot
Tanvie Hans
Rohit Kumar
Munmun Lugun
Ishan Pandita

Golf
Gaurav Ghei
Shiv Kapur
Rashid Khan
Chiragh Kumar
Mukesh Kumar
Amit Luthra
Himmat Rai
Jyoti Randhawa
Digvijay Singh

Hockey
Raghbir Singh Bhola
Arthur Charles Hind
Abdul Qayyum Khan
Manju Phalswal
Jaswant Singh Rajput
Aziz-ur Rehman
Joginder Singh
Khawaja Muhammad Taqi

Martial art
Om Prakash Bhardwaj
Akram Shah
Narender Singh

Skiing
Neha Ahuja, Winter Olympian
Shailaja Kumar, Winter Olympian

Table tennis
Manika Batra
Indu Puri

Boxing
Gaurav Bidhuri, world boxing Bronze medal winner

Tennis
Ankita Bhambri
Prerna Bhambri
Yuki Bhambri
Divij Sharan
Ashutosh Singh
Jasjit Singh

Wrestling
Jyoti
Parkash Gian
Guru Hanuman
Sonika Kaliraman
Pawan Kumar
Sushil Kumar
Sujeet Maan
Malwa Singh
Satpal Singh

Miscellaneous
 Gita Bhartiji (born 1944), Hindu guru.
 Ravi Gulati (born 1974), social activist.
 Laila Tyabji (born 1947), co-founder of Dastkar, Padma Shri (2012)

References 

Delhi
 *
People
Delhi